Analog Rebellion (formerly PlayRadioPlay!) is the solo, independent music project of Aledo, Texas songwriter Daniel Hunter. Hunter's solo career was started under the name PlayRadioPlay! in December 2005. Hunter changed the name to Analog Rebellion in September 2009, stating in his blog "I have come to the point where I no longer feel that the name PlayRadioPlay! represents the music I create".

Hunter writes, records and performs all of his own music, and refers to his sound as "stadium lo-fi", an oxymoronic synthesis of the low fidelity genre and stadium rock genre. Hunter's most recent music has been compared to The Paper Chase, Pixies and Secret Machines. In April 2010, Dallas Observer called Hunter "the most promising 20-year-old musician from DFW since Palomo".

Career

2008: Early success
Hunter began creating music in his garage, but it was not until he discovered music programming in music theory class at Aledo High School he began to create electronic-based music.

After rapidly gaining popularity on Myspace, Hunter signed with Island/Stolen Transmission midway through his senior year of high school. Hunter released an EP entitled The Frequency E.P. on April 27, 2007, which debuted at No. 6 on the Billboard Electronic chart and No. 27 on the Heatseekers chart. A full-length album entitled Texas was released March 18, 2008 debuting at No. 157 on the Billboard 200.  In support of the album, he toured nationally with American rock bands Fall Out Boy, Secondhand Serenade, Yellowcard, The Spill Canvas, Hellogoodbye and Making April.

Hunter left Island Records in late June 2008 after a two-year run. He described his affiliation with the company as a "nightmare" in his Myspace blog. Shortly after, on June 27, 2008, Hunter announced in his Myspace blog he had demoed a new EP entitled The Organic/Synthetic along with another unnamed EP; its songs were eventually released on his 2010 releases, Ancient Electrons and Besides, Nothing (B-Sides and Rarities, 2003–2009).

2009: Post-Island activity
On July 27, 2009, Hunter announced he would be simultaneously releasing a full-length album with new songs and a B-Sides album featuring songs from 2003–2009. Some of the songs had been posted on the Internet on different file-sharing sites, or performed live; others were songs that did not make it onto The Frequency E.P. or Texas, and some were PlayRadioPlay! 'classics' in their original form.

On July 31, 2009, Hunter announced he would be attempting to involve his fans in the creation of his new album. For a donation of a minimum of $10.00, the donor could have their name listed in the album credits as "Executive Producer _".  The donations were being raised to help promote and distribute the album. On September 17, 2009 it was announced the band's name would be changed to Analog Rebellion. On October 13, 2009 Hunter confirmed he would be releasing a new full-length album called Ancient Electrons under the new name.

2010-present: Ancient Electrons and other releases
On January 26, 2010, Hunter released two full-length albums, Ancient Electrons and Besides, Nothing (B-Sides and Rarities, 2003–2009). Both albums were made available at the Analog Rebellion merchandise store, and digitally via iTunes on the iTunes Store.

On April 22, 2010, Hunter announced Cavanaugh, Something (Pre-Sides and Varieties), a six-song, limited edition EP featuring demos and alternate versions of songs that will be on upcoming releases.

On February 18, 2014, Ill'e Grande was released. Hunter and DABBO RECORDS have since changed the live arrangement to a 5 piece band.

Discography

Island releases

Post-Island releases

Touring members
 Daniel Hunter - vocals, guitar
 Cory Harvard - drums
 Jeremy Lee Given - Keys
 Eric Messihi - Bassle
 Taylor Pile - Guitar/ MPC

Jon Burrow - drums (occasionally)

References

External links
 Analog Rebellion on Facebook
 Interview with PlayBackPress.com

Musical groups established in 2005
Musical groups from Texas
American new wave musical groups